The list of ship decommissionings in 2007 includes a chronological list of all ships decommissioned in 2007.


See also 

2007
 Ship decommissionings
Ship